Teddy Griffith (born 18 March 1936) is a Barbadian cricketer. He played twenty-five first-class matches for Barbados and Jamaica between 1953 and 1967.

References

External links
 

1936 births
Living people
Barbadian cricketers
Barbados cricketers
Jamaica cricketers
People from Saint Michael, Barbados